The first version of this article has been based in the text of :el:Α.Σ. Απόλλων of the Greek Wikipedia published under the GFDL.

A.S. Apollon Patras (Greek:A.Σ. Απόλλων Πατρών) is a multi-sports club that is based in Patras, Greece. It has included sports sections in association football, basketball, table tennis, and volleyball. The club is named after the ancient Greek God Apollo, and its team colours are black and white.

History
The club was founded in 1926, in the Prosfygika neighborhood. The football club entered the Achaea FCA, and played many matches against Panachaiki, APS Olympiakos, Patraikos, and Thyella. The team's ground was in the Olympiakos Patras Arena, today's Prosfygika Stadium.

The football team was later dissolved, and today Apollon is mainly a basketball team, K.A.E. Apollon Patras. It is a regular member of the top-tier level (Greek Basket League), has participated in the Saporta Cup (1997, 1998), the Korać Cup (1999), and has played in the Greek Cup Final in 1997, where they lost the title game against Olympiacos, by a score of 78–80.

Honours

Basketball

Men's team

Participation in the Premier Division (Basket League) (32x):  1972, 1974, 1977, 1978, 1980, 1981, 1982, 1983, 1984, 1985, 1986, 1987, 1988, 1989, 1990, 1991, 1993, 1994, 1995, 1996, 1997, 1998, 1999, 2004, 2005, 2006, 2007, 2013, 2014, 2015, 2016, 2017

Titles: (8x)
Divisional titles: (5x)
Greek A2 Basket League (3x): 1992,2003,2021
Greek B Basket League (2x): 1976,1979
Local titles: (4x)
Achaia Local Regional Championships (4x): 1956, 1958, 1971, 1973 

Greek Honours:
Greek Cup Finalist (2x): 1997, 2015

European honours:
Saporta Cup: Round of 16, 1997
Saporta Cup: Round of 32, 1998
Korać Cup: Round of 16, 1999

Women's team

Achaia local regional championship winner (3x): 1998, 2006, 2007

Volleyball 

Men's team

Achaia local regional championship winner (3x): 1998, 2005, 2007
Participation in the Second National Division: 2001, 2002
Participation in the Third National Division: 2004, 2006

Women's team
Achaia local regional championship winner (2x): 2007, 2008
Participation in the Second National Division: 2001, 2002

Football

Achaia local regional championship winner (3x): 1945, 1946, 1948
Participation in Greek Football Third Division (South): 1967, 1976

Table tennis

The club also competes in table tennis competitions, and it finished in fourth place in 1974. It produced athletes such as: Dimitrios Zikos, Giorgos Glarakis, Gerasimos Roussopoulos, and Spyros Kalogriopoulos.  Roussopoulos was a member of the team that won the Atomic Greek Youth Championships in 1971, and finished second in 1972 and 1973.

In 1969, along with Spyros Kalogriopoulos, they were Greek champions in the children's doubles, as athletes of Sporting Patras.

Gallery

References

Newspapers: Peloponnisos, I Imera, Proodos, I Gnomi, Patras Spor, Neologos, Patraiki Evdomadas, Fos, Allagi, Ta Gegonota and Ethnikos Kyrix
Lefkoma, 100 Years of Football (Soccer) in Patras – City of Patras 2006
Axaioi3.gr 
Sportsnet.gr
A.U. Apollon Patras
KAE Apollon Achaia-Clauss

External links
Official Website 
KAE apollon Achaia-Clauss 

Association football clubs established in 1926
Defunct football clubs in Greece
Table tennis organizations
Sport in Patras
1926 establishments in Greece